Ruma Devi is an Indian social worker, fashion designer and traditional handicraft artist from Barmer, Rajasthan. Ruma devi received the “Nari Shakti Puraskar 2018” the highest civilian honour for Women in India. She is associated with a network of over 30,000 rural women, trained them and linked them to the livelihood.

Early life
Ruma Devi was born in 1988 and grew up in Rawatsar in Barmer, Rajasthan. She dropped out of school when she was in 8th class. She learned embroidery from her grandmother during her childhood. She got married at the age of 17 and lost her first son in 48 hours of his birth.

Career
She started to do some work for earning. She started a self-help group after managing to convince about 10 women from her village in 2006. With a contribution of Rs 100 from each woman,  they bought second-hand stitching machine, cloth, threads and plastic wrappers for making cushions and bags.

Her quest for success took her to the doorstep of Gramin Vikas Evam Chetna Sansthan in Barmer and she joined it as a member in 2008 and went on to become the president of the non-governmental organization in 2010. She did her first exhibition in Rafi Marg, Delhi in 2010 and her first fashion show in Rajasthan Heritage Week 2016. She is now working towards promoting the craft of tribal artisans and minorities of all over India to get their craft and hands behind craft recognized.

Awards and honors

Nari Shakti Puraskar (2018) presented by the President of India Sh.Ramnath Kovind. 
 Shared stage with Amitabh Bachchan and Sonakshi Sinha on Kon Banega Crorepati Show (20 September 2019).
 Invited by Harvard University, Boston, U.S. as a panelist in its 17th all India conference (15-16 February 2020).
 Featured in Khaleej Times, Dubai <ref>{Khaleej Times}</ref>
 Featured at Indian singing reality show 'Indian Idol' in the special episode of Women's day (10 July 2021).
 Won the title of 'TFI Designer of the year 2019'.
 Featured on the cover page of India Today magazine in its anniversary edition with the title 'The New Bharat' in 2018. 
 Goodwill Ambassador and Chief Designer of Tribes India.
 State Brand Ambassador, Rajeevika[] 
 Honored by Doctorate in the field of art & textile by Mahatma Jyoti Rao Phule University, Jaipur.
 Shilpa Abhimani Award by the Govt of Sri Lanka: Promotion of handicrafts
 Honour by Women on Wings Netherlands (2016)

References

https://www.amarujala.com/photo-gallery/entertainment/television/kbc-11-amitabh-bachchan-show-ruma-devi-participate-karmaveer-episode

1989 births
Living people
Indian women fashion designers
Women artists from Rajasthan
People from Barmer, Rajasthan